Louise Labèque is a French actress. She made her breakthrough in Bertrand Bonello's fantasy film Zombi Child (2019).

Biography
Labèque studied at the French drama school Cours Florent for three years. One day some agents came by during the course and one of them gave her a card to go through a casting. In 2018, she made her film debut in The Trouble-Shooter (Roulez jeunesse), the first feature film by director Julien Guetta. That same year, she appeared as Marion Malinski in the comedy drama film In Your Hands (Au bout des doigts), directed by Ludovic Bernard.

In 2019, she played Fanny, one of the main roles in Bertrand Bonello's fantasy film Zombi Child. For her performance in the film, she was one of the young actresses shortlisted to compete for the César Award for Most Promising Actress, but did not get the nomination.

In 2021 and 2022, she played the role of Lisa Dayan in the television series En thérapie, created by Olivier Nakache & Éric Toledano.

In 2022, she landed the lead role in the film Coma by Bertrand Bonello, a hybrid live-action and animated film in which she plays the role of a young girl who navigates between dreams and reality, until she begins to follow a disturbing and mysterious YouTuber named Patricia Coma.

Her next projects are Annie Colère by Blandine Lenoir, and Toni, en famille by Nathan Ambrosioni.

Filmography

Feature films

Short films

Television

Awards and nominations

References

External links
 
 Louise Labèque on UniFrance
 Louise Labèque on AlloCiné
 Louise Labèque on Cineuropa

Living people
French film actresses
French television actresses
21st-century French actresses
Cours Florent alumni
Year of birth missing (living people)